All Saints Church, also known as the Anglican Church, is an Anglican church located in Kebon Sirih Administrative Village, Menteng, Jakarta. It is the only Anglican parish in Indonesia but there are 35 other Anglican churches throughout the country. The church is located in Jalan Arief Rahman Hakim, close to the Farmer's Statue. It is among the oldest church in Indonesia and was built in 1832. The churchyard of All Saints Church contains gravestones of British soldiers who fell during World War I and World War II, and earlier memorials e.g. Lieutenant Colonel William Campbell (died in 1811).

History
Land in Batavia was purchased by Rev. John Slater of the London Missionary Society in 1819 to establish a  station for chaplains to disembark to Asian countries such as China or Japan. This is the first English-speaking institution in Indonesia. On 7 January 1822, Reverend Walter Henry Medhurst was sent by London Missionary Society to work among the Chinese. In the same year he built a bamboo church over the land. The bamboo church lasted until 1828 when the church was renovated. The building was finished in 1829 in Georgian Style, without the extensions (the chancel, the sanctuary and the porch). At that time it was called Anglican Church, Dutch Engelse Kerk or Indonesian Gereja Inggris.

The church became affiliated with the Church of England and the original Missionary layout was changed. A sanctuary was added in 1851. A small organ was installed in 1857. This is replaced with a larger organ which is placed in a newly built special room in 1863. In 1924, these two were combined to form the chancel and sanctuary, the layout that is known today. In 1883, the British Protestant Community was formed which took over the church property. As a result, the name of the church was changed into Church of the British Protestant Community (BPC). Electricity was installed in 1909.

The British Protestant community continued to own the property until April 1965 when Australian ambassador Mick Shann transferred the property to the Indonesian Council of Churches as a gift. Then church became known as All Saints Church in 1970 and serves an international community of 30  nationalities.

See also

List of church buildings in Indonesia
List of colonial buildings and structures in Jakarta

References

Further reading
Lake, Rev. Andrew. All Saints Jakarta: Changes and Chances. Jakarta: All Saints Church. 2004.

External links
 All Saints Jakarta website

Churches in Jakarta
Churches completed in 1829
Colonial architecture in Jakarta
Cultural Properties of Indonesia in Jakarta